Jeffrey L. Smith (January 22, 1939 – July 7, 2004) was the author of several cookbooks and the host of The Frugal Gourmet, a popular American cooking show. The show began in Tacoma, Washington, as Cooking Fish Creatively on local PBS station KTPS (now KBTC), where it aired from 1973 to 1977. It then moved to WTTW in Chicago, and finally to KQED in San Francisco where it aired from 1984 to 1997. From 1972 to 1983, Smith was the owner and operator of the Chaplain's Pantry Restaurant and Gourmet Shop.

Early life
Smith was born in Tacoma, Washington on January 22, 1939. He graduated from the University of Puget Sound (UPS) in 1962. In 1965, he graduated from Drew University in New Jersey, which ordained him a minister in the United Methodist Church. In 1965, he became a chaplain at the University of Puget Sound. In 1966, Smith married his wife Patricia "Patty" Smith, and had two sons named Channing and Jason. Patricia is credited with originating the nickname "Frugal Gourmet". Smith served as a chaplain at UPS from 1966 to 1972. In 1972, he left the university to open and run the Chaplain's Pantry Restaurant and Gourmet Shop, a deli and kitchen supply store in Tacoma, where Smith and his students also offered cooking classes to the public.

Career
Smith began his television career in 1973 at KTPS in Tacoma with a show called Cooking Fish Creatively, which ran from 1973 to 1977, and was then renamed The Frugal Gourmet. In 1983, Smith moved to WTTW in Chicago, which took The Frugal Gourmet nationally in 1984. In 1991, Smith moved The Frugal Gourmet to PBS station KQED in San Francisco. The show aired for 11 seasons, with a total of 261 episodes produced.   

Over the course of his career, Smith published numerous cookbooks, such as Recipes from the Frugal Gourmet (1977), The Frugal Gourmet (1984), The Frugal Gourmet Cooks With Wine (1986), The Frugal Gourmet Cooks American (1987), The Frugal Gourmet Cooks Three Ancient Cuisines (1989), The Frugal Gourmet on Our Immigrant Ancestors (1990), The Frugal Gourmet Celebrates Christmas (1991), The Frugal Gourmet's Culinary Handbook (1991), The Frugal Gourmet Whole Family Cookbook (1992), The Frugal Gourmet Cooks Italian (1993), and The Frugal Gourmet Keeps the Feast (1995). 
  
Smith was regarded as a "genius" by some and as a "tyrant" by others. Kathy Casey, a Seattle Times food columnist and longtime friend of Smith's, described him as a knowledgeable and generous man who "...knew more about food and culture than anybody I know in the food world." She said he donated both money and time to charitable causes and helped individuals get started in the food industry, even after his retirement.

Smith also had his share of detractors. Irena Chalmers, a faculty member at the Culinary Institute of America and president of the International Association of Culinary Professionals, once described him as "the Frugal Gourmet, who is neither". Chicago Tribune food and wine columnist William Rice wrote, "I've tried to cook his stuff, and let's say it was hit or miss. Some things worked and others didn't." Newsweek writer Laura Shapiro criticized him as "a prime example of prominent cooks who may compromise their integrity by being paid to recommend food products and kitchen ware." She cited The Frugal Gourmet Whole Family Cookbook as "...especially shocking ... the cookbook as infomercial". In a 1992 Harper's Magazine article, Barbara Grizzuti Harrison ridiculed him as "...a purveyor of patronizing poppycock ... conveyed with the kind of mock anger that is always a mask for real anger." Smith brushed aside such criticism: "Not many people read Harper's," he said. "That's a very small audience." He continued, "People criticize me for enjoying good food when I use the word frugal. Frugal doesn't mean cheap. It means you don't waste your money. They haven't read my books. They don't know the meaning of the word."

Sexual abuse allegations
In 1997, seven men filed a civil lawsuit against Smith, charging him with sexual abuse. Six of them alleged that they were molested as teenagers in the 1970s while working at the Chaplain's Pantry in Tacoma; the seventh claimed that he was assaulted in 1992, at age 14, after Smith picked him up as a hitchhiker.  Smith denied the allegations, and no criminal charges were filed, but he and his insurers settled the cases for an undisclosed amount in 1998. The litigation ended his television career, though he continued his writing and charitable work.

Death
Smith died in his sleep of heart disease on July 10, 2004 at the age of 65. He was survived by his wife Patricia "Patty" Smith, and sons Channing and Jason, as well as daughters-in-law Yuki and Lisa.

Bibliography
 Recipes from the Frugal Gourmet (1977)
 The Frugal Gourmet (1984)
 The Frugal Gourmet Cooks with Wine (1986)
 The Frugal Gourmet Cooks American (1987)
 The Frugal Gourmet Cooks Three Ancient Cuisines: China, Greece, and Rome (1989)
 The Frugal Gourmet on Our Immigrant Ancestors: Recipes You Should Have Gotten from Your Grandmother (1990)
 The Frugal Gourmet Celebrates Christmas (1991)
 The Frugal Gourmet's Culinary Handbook: An Updated Version of an American Classic on Food and Cooking (1991)
 The Frugal Gourmet Whole Family Cookbook: Recipes and Reflections for Contemporary Living (1992)
 The Frugal Gourmet Cooks Italian: Recipes from the New and Old Worlds, Simplified for the American Kitchen (1993)
 The Frugal Gourmet Keeps the Feast: Past, Present, and Future'' (1995)

References

Further reading

External links
 Jeff Smith bio at the Internet Movie Database
 The Frugal Gourmet at the Internet Movie Database

1939 births
2004 deaths
American male chefs
American food writers
American television chefs
Drew University alumni
Writers from Tacoma, Washington
University of Puget Sound alumni
Chefs from Washington (state)
20th-century Methodist ministers
21st-century Methodist ministers
American United Methodist clergy